The Consolidator; or, Memoirs of Sundry Transactions from the World in the Moon is a fictional adventure by Daniel Defoe published in 1705. It is a satirical novel that mixes fantasy with political and social satire.

Plot summary

The narrator travels to the Moon through the means of the titular "consolidator" – a chariot with two feathered winged creatures.

Analysis 
The novel is a political satire of the British political and society of Defoe's era. For example, each of the chariot's winged steeds represents a houses of parliament.

The chariot has also been described as one of the earliest spaceships (or airships) in known fiction. This, in addition to its portrayal of the Moon and the concept of space flight, resulted in the work being classified as one of the proto-SF works.

References

External links
 

1705 books
Novels by Daniel Defoe
English adventure novels
English historical novels
18th-century British novels
Novels set in Imperial China
Novels set on the Moon
Satirical novels